Robert T. Anderson (born March 8, 1945) is an American politician who was the Lieutenant Governor of Iowa from 1983 to 1987. A Democrat,  he was the last male to be elected as Lieutenant Governor of Iowa until Adam Gregg was elected in 2018.
Anderson was the first Democrat in Iowa history elected Lieutenant Governor alongside a Republican Governor. Anderson received his bachelor's and master's degrees from the University of Iowa. He was also a high school teacher, and served in the Iowa House of Representatives. In 1987 he was a founder and executive director of the Iowa Peace Institute. He created the IRIS, Inc. (Iowa Resource for International Service in 1993. Those organizations have brought more than 2000 persons from the former Soviet Union, Central Europe, Asia and Africa to Iowa and organized travel to Iowa leaders to those parts of the country. Most recently, IRIS has arranged for more than 600 high school students from Nigeria and Tanzania to spend a year attending Iowa high schools through the State Department's Youth Education and Study (YES) program. Anderson was a sponsor for Thai Dam refugees in the 1970s and 80s. He led programs to assist Iraqi refugees in Iowa in 2008–09, and was named Immigrant Entrepreneurial Champion in 2009. Prior to his retirement, he also served as executive director of the Institute for Tomorrow's Workforce, an initiative to improve k-12 educational opportunity in Iowa. He received the Outstanding Alumni for Service award from the University of Iowa in 2013. Currently he and his wife are living in Gig Harbor, Washington. He is an active volunteer Court Appointed Special Advocate, facilitates a Youth Suicide Prevention Coalition and is active with youth through the Midday Rotary Club of Gig Harbor.

References

 

Lieutenant Governors of Iowa
Living people
1945 births
Politicians from Marshalltown, Iowa
University of Iowa alumni
Democratic Party members of the Iowa House of Representatives